Timothy J. Dillon was the former director of athletics at Canisius College. He was hired in 2000 to replace long time Canisius athletic director Daniel Starr. During his tenure at Canisius, he made the decision to eliminate the school's football program in 2002, as part of an effort to overhaul and streamline the school's athletic department. Dillon resigned his position at Canisius in February 2005.

References

Year of birth uncertain
Place of birth missing (living people)
Living people
Canisius Golden Griffins athletic directors
UNC Asheville Bulldogs athletic directors
Year of birth missing (living people)